Brooklyn Nine-Nine is an American police procedural comedy television series which premiered on September 17, 2013, on Fox. The series, created by Dan Goor and Michael Schur, follows a team of detectives and a newly appointed captain in the 99th Precinct of the New York City Police Department in Brooklyn. In May 2018, Fox canceled the series; the following day, NBC picked up the series.

Series overview

Episodes

Season 1 (2013–14)

Season 2 (2014–15)

Season 3 (2015–16)

Season 4 (2016–17)

Season 5 (2017−18)

Season 6 (2019)

Season 7 (2020)

Season 8 (2021)

Ratings

Webisodes

Detective Skills with Hitchcock and Scully

References

External links
  at Fox
  at NBC
 

 
Lists of American crime television series episodes
Lists of American sitcom episodes